Draper House is a historic home located at Milford, Sussex County, Delaware.  It was built in 1870, and is a two-story, five bay, center hall, frame dwelling originally built in the Victorian Gothic style.  It was remodeled in the early-20th century with elements of Queen Anne and Classical Revival building traditions.  It has a hipped roof with dormers, a telescoping turret, a truncated tower, a second floor projecting bay with a Palladian window, and a full three-sided porch with a shadow curve supported by Ionic order columns. From 1948 to 1953, it was owned by the Milford Hospital and used by them as housing for nurses.

It was added to the National Register of Historic Places in 1982.

References

Houses on the National Register of Historic Places in Delaware
Queen Anne architecture in Delaware
Gothic Revival architecture in Delaware
Neoclassical architecture in Delaware
Houses completed in 1870
Houses in Milford, Delaware
Houses in Sussex County, Delaware
National Register of Historic Places in Sussex County, Delaware